The Christine E. Lynn College of Nursing is an academic college of Florida Atlantic University in Boca Raton, Florida, United States and serves as the university's only nursing school. The Lynn College of Nursing provides nursing education at the undergraduate and graduate levels.

Currently, the College of Nursing offers bachelor’s, master’s, DNP and PhD  degree programs with approximately 1,700 nursing students enrolled at FAU’s Boca Raton, Davie, and Harbor Branch Oceanographic Institute locations.  It is accredited by the Commission on Collegiate Nursing Education; the next accreditation visit will be in 2023.

 Christine E. Lynn Center for Caring which supports programs that humanize health care
 Initiative for Intentional Health offering programs that foster holistic approaches for health and healing
The Anne Boykin Institute for the Advancement of Caring in Nursing promoting the significance of caring in nursing 
 Louis and Anne Green Memory and Wellness Center that provides innovative services to address memory loss
 The FAU Community Health Center promoting the health of the Westgate community by providing primary care, mental health and specialty care services including diabetes education.

In February 2006, FAU dedicated the new home of the Christine E. Lynn College of Nursing.  The building was made possible by a $10 million gift from Mrs. Christine E. Lynn and was matched in full with state funding.

References

Florida Atlantic University